The bicolored musk shrew (Crocidura fuscomurina) is a species of mammal in the family Soricidae. It is found in Angola, Benin, Botswana, Burkina Faso, Burundi, Cameroon, Central African Republic, Chad, Democratic Republic of the Congo, Ivory Coast, Ethiopia, Gambia, Ghana, Guinea, Guinea-Bissau, Kenya, Lesotho, Malawi, Mali, Mauritania, Mozambique, Namibia, Niger, Nigeria, Rwanda, Senegal, Sierra Leone, South Africa, Sudan, Tanzania, Togo, Uganda, Zambia, and Zimbabwe. Its natural habitats are savanna, subtropical or tropical dry lowland grassland, and hot deserts.

References
 Hutterer, R. & Howell, K. 2004.  Crocidura fuscomurina.   2006 IUCN Red List of Threatened Species.   Downloaded on 30 July 2007.

Crocidura
Mammals described in 1865
Taxonomy articles created by Polbot
Taxa named by Theodor von Heuglin